Burnin' the Roadhouse Down is the thirteenth studio album by American country music artist Steve Wariner, released on April 21, 1998. It was the first of three albums that he recorded for Capitol Nashville after having been dropped from Arista Records' roster in 1996. It was the second album of Wariner's career to achieve RIAA gold certification for U.S. sales of 500,000 copies, and it produced four Top 40 hit singles for Wariner on the Billboard country charts.

History 
Despite having not charted a Top 40 country single since 1994, Steve Wariner had been finding success in the late 1990s as a songwriter, including the Number One hits "Longneck Bottle" for Garth Brooks and "Nothin' but the Taillights" for Clint Black, as well as Bryan White's Top 20 country hit "One Small Miracle". The success of the songs that he had written led to Wariner's signing with Capitol Records Nashville in late 1997. He also sang duet vocals on Anita Cochran's late 1997-early 1998 Number One hit "What If I Said". "Longneck Bottle", "Nothin' but the Taillights", "One Small Miracle", and this song were sometimes played on radio in dedicated "Steve Wariner blocks".

"What If I Said" was the second single from Cochran's debut album Back to You, released on Warner Bros. Records shortly before Burnin' the Roadhouse Down was issued. This song was not only Cochran's only Number One country hit, but also her only Top 40 country hit, and Wariner's first Number One since 1989's "I Got Dreams". This duet is also included on this album as a bonus track.

Four of Wariner's own singles were released from this album after "What If I Said" peaked, starting with the ballad "Holes in the Floor of Heaven", which peaked at number 2 on the country charts. Following it was "Road Trippin'" at number 55, the title track (a duet with Garth Brooks) at number 26, and "Every Little Whisper" at number 36. Also included on this album is a song entitled "Love Me Like You Love Me", which Clay Walker previously recorded on his 1995 album Hypnotize the Moon.

Track listing

Personnel 
As listed in liner notes.
 Garth Brooks – vocals on "Burnin' the Roadhouse Down"
 Anita Cochran – vocals on "What If I Said"
 Bill Cuomo – synthesizer
 Stuart Duncan – fiddle
 Buddy Emmons – steel guitar
 Paul Franklin – steel guitar
 Ron Gannaway – drums
 John Gardner – drums
 Sonny Garrish – steel guitar
 Hoot Hester – fiddle, mandolin
 John Barlow Jarvis – piano, keyboards
 Paul Leim – drums
 Woody Lingle – bass guitar
 Brent Mason – electric guitar
 Steve Nathan – piano, Hammond B-3 organ
 Hargus "Pig" Robbins – piano
 Harry Stinson – background vocals
 Steve Wariner – lead vocals, background vocals, acoustic guitar, electric guitar, Dobro
 Glenn Worf – bass guitar
 Trisha Yearwood – background vocals
 Reggie Young – electric guitar
 Andrea Zonn – background vocals

Strings performed by the Nashville String Machine; conducted by Carl Gorodetzky and arranged by Bergen White.

Chart performance

Weekly charts

Year-end charts

References 

1998 albums
Steve Wariner albums
Capitol Records albums